Diego Salcedo may refer to:

 Diego Salcedo (soldier) (died 1511), Spanish conquistador
 Diego Salcedo (bishop) (1575–1644), Spanish bishop

See also
 Diego de Salcedo, Spanish army officer and Governor-General of the Philippines, 1663–1668